Joe A. Kalu-Igboama was a Nigerian Navy (Captain) and was the Military Administrator of Adamawa State between August 1996 and August 1998 during the military regime of General Sani Abacha.

References

Year of birth missing (living people)
Living people
Governors of Adamawa State